Christine Frances McLoughlin  (born 1964 or 1965) is an Australian business executive, who is Chair of the Suncorp Group and Chancellor of the University of Wollongong.

Career 
McLoughlin graduated from the Australian National University with a BA (1984) and LLB (1986). Her honours thesis was titled "Recent developments in corporate financing: Redeemable preference shares and convertible notes".

On graduation McLoughlin began her career working for law firm Allen Allen and Hemsley from 1987 to 1992, moving to Optus Communications in 1993 as their corporate counsel. From there she became general manager of the Office of the CEO at AMP Limited from 1997 to 2004. She then joined Insurance Australia and later Westpac, in their insurance arm.

McLoughlin was a member of the board of  Australian Nuclear Science and Technology Organisation from 2009 to 2013. She joined the board of Suncorp Group in 2015 and has been chair since 2018. She is one of the co-founders and chair of the Minerva Network, an organisation of businesswomen who mentor women athletes. She is chairman of the board of Destination NSW and also serves on the boards of the nib Group, the McGrath Foundation and Cochlear Limited.

She was appointed the fourth Chancellor of the University of Wollongong, taking over the role from Jillian Broadbent  in 2020.

She was appointed a Member of the Order of Australia in the 2021 Queen's Birthday Honours for her "significant service to business, to the not-for-profit sector, and to women".

References

External links 

 

1960s births
Living people
Year of birth missing (living people)
Members of the Order of Australia
Australian National University alumni
Australian women business executives
21st-century Australian businesswomen
21st-century Australian businesspeople
Academic staff of the University of Wollongong